Smicrips is a genus of palmetto beetles in the family Smicripidae. There are at least 2 described species in Smicrips.

Species
 Smicrips palmicola LeConte, 1878
 Smicrips texana (Casey, 1916)

References

 Price, Michele B. / Arnett, Ross H. Jr., Michael C. Thomas, Paul E. Skelley, and J. H. Frank, eds. (2002). "Family 78. Smicripidae Horn 1879". American Beetles, vol. 2: Polyphaga: Scarabaeoidea through Curculionoidea, 316–318.

Further reading

 Arnett, R. H. Jr., M. C. Thomas, P. E. Skelley and J. H. Frank. (eds.). (21 June 2002). American Beetles, Volume II: Polyphaga: Scarabaeoidea through Curculionoidea. CRC Press LLC, Boca Raton, Florida .
 
 Richard E. White. (1983). Peterson Field Guides: Beetles. Houghton Mifflin Company.

External links

 NCBI Taxonomy Browser, Smicrips

Cucujoidea genera